Mission Hills High School is a high school located in San Marcos, California. It has many career-oriented programs, such as the Academies of Business, Law Enforcement, Health Essentials, Fire Technology, and Culinary Arts.

PACE Promise
The PACE Promise, a joint program of San Marcos Unified School District (SMUSD) and California State University San Marcos (CSUSM), guarantees CSUSM admission to all district students continuously enrolled in the district from 9th through 12th grade who meet entrance requirements. This program begins with the SMUSD graduating classes of 2009.

The Promise provides a step-by-step plan of preparation for college. Beginning in seventh grade, San Marcos students must work to fulfill program expectations. Meeting these requirements also prepares them for admission to most California public and private universities and colleges. Students who meet all the program's academic benchmarks and the financial need criteria, as determined by CSUSM, may receive monetary assistance from a private foundation associated with the Promise while attending the university.

Improving college options for this generation of students, the Promise provides dynamic, accelerated services which include tutoring and mentoring, visits to the university campus, enhanced test preparation for English and math entry-level exams, and extensive information regarding college preparation and admission. The Promise thus provides a vital link from the secondary school setting to the university.

Mission Hills Football
The Mission Hills varsity football team won the 2013 CIF San Diego Section Open Division Championship defeating Oceanside 36-14. That was the team's first ever CIF Championship victory as they lost the championship in 2007 (Oceanside), 2010 (Oceanside), and 2012 (Eastlake).  The 2013 CIF team was also one of the top ranked teams in the state of California and later lost to Bakersfield High School in the SoCal State Regional game.

Mission Hills Girls Basketball 
The Mission Hills Girls Varsity Basketball team went undefeated in league in 2014, 2015 and 2016. They won the 2014 San Diego Section Division 1 Championship, defeating Mt. Carmel 62-43. That was the team's first ever CIF Championship victory, as they lost in the semi-finals to Granite Hills in 2013. After winning CIF for the first time, they beat Mark Keppel in the first round of CA Division 1 State Playoffs, 54-50. They then lost to eventual CA D1 State Champions Canyon Springs in the second round of state playoffs, 69-33.

In 2015, MHHS moved to the Open Division and won the 2015 San Diego Section Open Division Championship, again defeating Mt. Carmel. This time the score was 58-41. The team went on to lose in the first round of the CA State Open Division playoffs, beaten 58-41 by Long Beach Poly, a perennial powerhouse.

In 2016, MHHS defended their San Diego Section Open Division Championship title, defeating La Jolla County Day 68-64. MHHS went on to defeat Winward in the first round of the CA State Open Division Championships 49-45. MHHS then lost to Chaminade, the eventual CA State Open Division Champions, 79-59, in the CA Elite Eight Regional Semi-Final.

MHHS was ranked as high as #5 in CA by Cal Hi Sports during the 2015-16 season.

The team is coached by Chris Kroesch and Patrick Freeman.

California wildfires of October 2007
During the California wildfires of October 2007, Mission Hills High School opened its campus on October 20 for evacuated refugees. The evacuation site offered a place to sleep, food, and activities such as soccer, skateboarding, football, and basketball. Mission Hills also allowed pet owners to keep small animals.

Jack Ashby Field
Mission Hills High school is home to one of several fields that have names in San Diego County. The field was named in honor of long time San Marcos coach, Jack Ashby. He served as the school's first athletic director before retiring in 2005.

Demographics
Hispanic: 49.3% (+1.2%)
White: 36.7% (-1.2%)
Filipino: 3.5% (-0.6%)
Asian: 4.6% (+0.2%)
African-American 3.6% (-0.2%)

Notable alumni 

Marcus Hatley – Former professional baseball pitcher
Chris Olave – Wide receiver for the New Orleans Saints
Fred Warner – Professional football linebacker

See also 
 San Marcos High School
 Escondido High School
 California wildfires of October 2007

References

External links 
 

Education in San Marcos, California
High schools in San Diego County, California
Public high schools in California
Educational institutions established in 2004
2004 establishments in California